Marc, Baron Bossuyt (born 9 January 1944 in Ghent) is a member of the Permanent Court of Arbitration in The Hague and a former judge at the Belgian Constitutional Court.

Bossuyt obtained a Dr.iur (LLM) at the University of Ghent in 1968, a Certificate of international relations at Johns Hopkins University in Bologna in 1969, and a PhD in political science from the Graduate Institute of International Studies in 1975. He is professor emeritus of international law at the University of Antwerp.

He was appointed to the Constitutional Court by Royal Order on 28 January 1997. From 9 October 2007 until his retirement Bossuyt was the President of the Dutch linguistic group of the Constitutional Court of Belgium. He was ennobled as a baron in the 2009 honours list. Upon reaching the mandatory retirement age of 70 years, Bossuyt retired from the Court and became President-Emeritus.

Bossuyt was a member of the UN Committee on the Elimination of Racial Discrimination (2000–2003, 2014–present).

Honours 
 2013 : Grand Cordon in the Order of Leopold
 2007 : Knight Grand Cross in the Order of the Crown.

External links
 Marc Bossuyt (UA)

1944 births
Living people
20th-century Belgian judges
Barons of Belgium
Grand Crosses of the Order of the Crown (Belgium)
Flemish academics
Constitutional Court of Belgium judges
Members of the Sub-Commission on the Promotion and Protection of Human Rights
Members of the Committee on the Elimination of Racial Discrimination
Members of the Permanent Court of Arbitration
Ghent University alumni
Graduate Institute of International and Development Studies alumni
Academic staff of the University of Antwerp
Belgian officials of the United Nations
Belgian judges of international courts and tribunals
21st-century Belgian judges